The White Chapel is a Canadian short drama film, directed by Simon Lavoie and released in 2005. The film stars Hélène Loiselle as Rose-Flore, an elderly woman living in a small town whose familiar routines are disrupted when the small white chapel across the street from her home is repainted blue.

The film premiered at the 2005 Toronto International Film Festival.

The film won the Jutra Award for Best Live Action Short Film at the 8th Jutra Awards in 2006.

References

External links
 

2005 films
2005 short films
2005 drama films
Films directed by Simon Lavoie
French-language Canadian films
Canadian drama short films
2000s Canadian films